The Gennady Zyuganov presidential campaign, 2008 was the presidential campaign of Gennady Zyuganov in the 2008 election. This was the third presidential campaign of Zyuganov, who had been a candidate in both the 1996 and 2000 elections.

Background and early developments

In October 2005, Zyuganov indicated that he would run for president in 2008, making him the second person to enter the race for the Kremlin following former Prime Minister Mikhail Kasyanov. According to one report, Zyuganov pledged to quadruple pensions and state salaries, should he be elected.

Campaigning

In January 2008, Zyuganov challenged Dmitry Medvedev, Putin's chosen successor, to an open, televised debate, but Medvedev refused to take part, citing lack of time.

In the presidential election on March 2, 2008, Zyuganov garnered 17.76% of the vote and came in second to Medvedev's 70.23%.

Positions

See also
Gennady Zyuganov presidential campaign, 1996
Gennady Zyuganov presidential campaign, 2000
Gennady Zyuganov presidential campaign, 2012

References

Zyuganov
presidential campaign, 2008
Zyuganov, 2008